The Port of Port Elizabeth is a port in the city of Port Elizabeth, in the Eastern Cape, South Africa. Located in Algoa Bay, it handles dry bulk, bulk liquid, breakbulk and containers, as well as providing facilities for tugs and fishing vessels.

See also
 2021 Transnet Cyberattack

References

External links 

Port Elizabeth
Port Elizabeth
Port Elizabeth